Michael Panes is an American actor, writer, musician and composer. He attended Brown University and graduated with a music degree. He has appeared in numerous off-Broadway plays and has been noted as a gifted comedian with an uncanny resemblance to Peter Sellers. He appeared in Lisa Loeb's reality television series Number 1 Single. The two were old friends and during the course of the show began to date. At the end of the series the status of their relationship was in question as Panes had to move to Los Angeles for an acting role. He asked Loeb to accompany him, but she declined his offer, feeling she needed to stay in New York City and concentrate on her music. Loeb has since married.

Panes's film roles include classical musician Levi Panes in The Anniversary Party and Gore Vidal in Infamous.

Filmography
 The Anniversary Party (2001)
 Infamous (2006)
 Girlrillaz (2013)

References

External links

20th-century American male actors
21st-century American male actors
American male film actors
American male stage actors
American male television actors
American male television writers
American television writers
Brown University alumni
Living people
Male actors from New York (state)
Year of birth missing (living people)